KCHE-FM (92.1 FM) is a commercial radio station licensed to serve the community of Cherokee, Iowa.  The station primarily broadcasts a classic hits format.  KCHE-FM is owned by Simon Fuller, through licensee Better Broadcasting Incorporated.

Former owners include Sioux Valley Broadcasting Company, Inc, Cherokee Broadcasting Company, and J & J Broadcasting Corporation.

The antenna array is a Harris Corporation model FML-3E. The tower is shared with its sister station KCHE (AM). The broadcast site is located one mile north of Cherokee on U.S. Route 59.

External links
KCHE official website

CHE-FM
Cherokee, Iowa